Flavio Horacio Robatto (born 16 January 1974) is an Argentine football manager and former player who played as a midfielder. He is the current manager of Bolivian club Nacional Potosí.

Career
Born in Río Cuarto, Córdoba, Robatto was a youth graduate of hometown side Estudiantes de Río Cuarto before being registered as a Platense player. He retired at the age of 26 due to a Hepatitis B, and subsequently became a manager.

Robatto then managed several lowly sides in his home country before moving abroad in 2011, as an assistant manager of Álex Aguinaga. In 2015, he worked as manager of Norte América before being named Rubén Israel's assistant at Millonarios.

In March 2017, Robatto was appointed manager of Cúcuta Deportivo, but was sacked on 21 November. He was named in charge of Peruvian Segunda División side Alianza Atlético the following 24 February, but was dismissed on 6 June 2018.

In August 2018, Robatto agreed to a deal with Atlético Bucaramanga to become their manager, but the deal was cancelled days later, due to a supposed deal with Polish side MKS Kalwarianka. Late in the month, he was announced as manager of Jaguares de Córdoba.

Robatto resigned from Jaguares on 29 October 2018, and took over LDU Loja in Ecuador the following 20 June. On 2 January 2020, he was appointed in charge of Atlético Huila, but resigned in September.

On 13 April 2021, Robatto replaced Álvaro Peña as manager of Bolivian side Nacional Potosí. He was in charge of the side on two further occasions, in 2022 and 2023.

References

External links

1978 births
Living people
People from Río Cuarto, Córdoba
Argentine footballers
Association football midfielders
Club Atlético Platense footballers
Club Comunicaciones footballers
Argentine football managers
Bolivian Primera División managers
Cúcuta Deportivo managers
Alianza Atlético managers
Atlético Huila managers
Jaguares de Córdoba managers
Nacional Potosí managers
Argentine expatriate football managers
Argentine expatriate sportspeople in Ecuador
Argentine expatriate sportspeople in Colombia
Argentine expatriate sportspeople in Peru
Argentine expatriate sportspeople in Bolivia
Expatriate football managers in Ecuador
Expatriate football managers in Colombia
Expatriate football managers in Peru
Expatriate football managers in Bolivia
Sportspeople from Córdoba Province, Argentina
L.D.U. Loja managers